Myriapora truncata, also known by its common name false coral is a species from the genus Myriapora. The species was originally described by Peter Simon Pallas in 1766.

Description 
Myriapora truncata is a common species on rocky environments from the water surface to a depth of 60 meter, where it forms calcareous colonies. It has a bright red colour which earned it its common name of  "False coral".

Ecology 
Studies suggest that M. truncata  seem well able to withstand the levels of ocean acidification predicted in the next 200 years.

Natural products 
Myriapora truncata is the source of 4 polyketide-derived metabolites: Myriaprones 1-4

References

Taxa named by Peter Simon Pallas
Cheilostomatida